Clearwater County is a county located in the U.S. state of Idaho. As of the 2020 census, the population was 8,734. The county seat is Orofino. Established in 1911, the county was named after the Clearwater River.

The county is home to North Fork of the Clearwater River, and a small portion of the South Fork and the main Clearwater. Also in the county are the Dworshak Reservoir, Dworshak State Park, Dworshak National Fish Hatchery, and the Dworshak Dam, third highest in the U.S. The modest Bald Mountain ski area is located between Orofino and Pierce.

History
The Clearwater River and Lolo Pass, in the southeast corner of the county, were made famous by the exploration of Lewis and Clark in the early 19th century. Following an arduous trek through the Bitterroot Mountains, suffering through a mid-September snowstorm and near starvation, the Corps of Discovery expedition camped with the Nez Perce tribe on the Weippe Prairie outside of present-day Weippe in 1805. With the assistance of the Nez Perce, the expedition recuperated and constructed burned-out canoes at Canoe Camp in October 1805 and then paddled down the Clearwater, Snake, and Columbia rivers and met the Pacific Ocean a month later at present-day Astoria, Oregon.

Until 1904, Clearwater County was part of Shoshone County to the north. It was annexed by Nez Perce County for several years and then was established as a new county in 1911. The original county seat of Shoshone County was Pierce, in today's Clearwater County. It was the first gold rush area of present-day Idaho (then Washington Territory) in 1860 and was made the county seat of a vast Shoshone County in 1861, two years prior to the establishment of the Idaho Territory. When the Silver Valley population rose dramatically in the 1880s, the seat was moved to Murray in 1884 (and to Wallace in 1898) to better serve the majority of the county's population. The population of the southern area increased with homesteading in the Weippe area in the late 1890s. The vast distance and time required for travel to Wallace from the Clearwater River area prompted the move of the southern portion to Nez Perce County.

Geography

It is part of the Palouse, a wide and rolling prairie-like region of the middle Columbia basin.

Adjacent counties
 Shoshone County – north
 Mineral County, Montana – northeast/Mountain Time Border
 Missoula County, Montana– east/Mountain Time Border
 Idaho County – south
 Lewis County – southwest
 Nez Perce County – southwest
 Latah County – west

Major highways
 US-12
 SH-7
 SH-8
 SH-11

National protected areas
 Clearwater National Forest (part)
Mallard-Larkins Pioneer Area
Lolo Trail National Historic Landmark (part)
 Nez Perce National Historical Park (part)
Canoe Camp
Musselshell Meadows
Pierce Courthouse
Weippe Prairie
 St. Joe National Forest (part)

Ski area
 Bald Mountain Ski Area

Government and infrastructure
The Idaho Department of Correction operates the Idaho Correctional Institution-Orofino in Orofino.

Demographics

2000 census
As of the census of 2000, there were 8,930 people, 3,456 households, and 2,481 families living in the county. The population density was 3.6 people per square mile (1.5/km2). There were 4,144 housing units at an average density of 2 per square mile (1/km2). The racial makeup of the county was 94.82% White, 0.15% Black or African American, 2.03% Native American, 0.37% Asian, 0.06% Pacific Islander, 0.63% from other races, and 1.96% from two or more races. 1.85% of the population were Hispanic or Latino of any race. 24.0% were of German, 14.0% English, 11.7% Irish and 10.5% American ancestry.

There were 3,456 households, out of which 28.90% had children under the age of 18 living with them, 60.50% were married couples living together, 6.90% had a female householder with no husband present, and 28.20% were non-families. 24.00% of all households were made up of individuals, and 10.00% had someone living alone who was 65 years of age or older. The average household size was 2.41 and the average family size was 2.84.

In the county, the population was spread out, with 23.00% under the age of 18, 5.90% from 18 to 24, 26.30% from 25 to 44, 29.20% from 45 to 64, and 15.60% who were 65 years of age or older. The median age was 42 years. For every 100 females there were 113.40 males. For every 100 females age 18 and over, there were 115.90 males.

The median income for a household in the county was $32,071, and the median income for a family was $37,259. Males had a median income of $31,426 versus $21,694 for females. The per capita income for the county was $15,463. About 9.70% of families and 13.50% of the population were below the poverty line, including 18.90% of those under age 18 and 8.20% of those age 65 or over.

2010 census
As of the 2010 United States Census, there were 8,761 people, 3,660 households, and 2,397 families living in the county. The racial makeup of the county was 93.9% white, 2.2% American Indian, 0.7% Asian, 0.2% black or African American, 0.1% Pacific islander, 0.8% from other races, and 2.1% from two or more races. Those of Hispanic or Latino origin made up 3.1% of the population. In terms of ancestry, 29.3% were German, 17.8% were Irish, 13.8% were English, 6.7% were American, and 6.2% were Norwegian.

Of the 3,660 households, 22.8% had children under the age of 18 living with them, 54.7% were married couples living together, 6.4% had a female householder with no husband present, 34.5% were non-families, and 29.3% of all households were made up of individuals. The average household size was 2.23 and the average family size was 2.71. The median age was 49.0 years.

The median income for a household in the county was $41,835 and the median income for a family was $46,415. Males had a median income of $42,568 versus $30,048 for females. The per capita income for the county was $20,507. About 9.0% of families and 11.7% of the population were below the poverty line, including 14.7% of those under age 18 and 7.6% of those age 65 or over.

Communities

Cities
Elk River
Orofino
Pierce
Weippe

Unincorporated communities

Ahsahka
Cardiff
Cavendish
Dent
Grangemont
Greer
Headquarters
Hollywood
Judge Town
Konkolville
Moose City
Teakean

Ghost town
Fraser

Population ranking
The population ranking of the following table is based on the 2010 census of Clearwater County.

† county seat

Politics

See also
National Register of Historic Places listings in Clearwater County, Idaho

References

External links
 
 State of Idaho – Clearwater County
 Clearwater Museum – official site

 

 
Idaho counties
1911 establishments in Idaho
Populated places established in 1911